The Nokia 6310i is a mobile phone from Nokia first introduced at the CeBIT fair in March 2002 with sales starting later that year and discontinued in late 2005, it was Nokia's first tri-band phone offering (GSM 900/1800/1900). Primarily marketed as a business phone, it was for some years the dominant GSM device in the corporate world. The device was most commonly offered in Two-tone Silver/Grey or Two-tone Gold/Black trim; the third option, a Copper coloured variant, was much rarer.

The model is basically the same as the earlier 6310 from 2001, with the addition of tri-band reception, Java and a blue-backlit LCD Screen (as opposed to the earlier green backlighting). The 6310 itself replaced the 6210 from 2000, preceded by the 6150 (1998) and 6110 (1997). Accessories (such as batteries) can generally be swapped between all these models.

This phone has been (and still is) very popular for its robustness, simplicity and long battery life years after being discontinued as a product. Many have called the 6310i one of the best handsets Nokia ever produced.

Mercedes-Benz
Like the 6210 and 6310, the 6310i was optionally included on several Mercedes-Benz cars. A cradle was installed in the dashboard, into which the phone was securely placed. Connectors in the cradle provided the phone with electrical power, routed the audio path through the car's audio system, and an external antenna mounted on the car's chassis replaced the internal antenna, providing a stronger signal and better signal-to-noise ratio.

Features

 E-mail, text and picture messages
 GPRS
 HSCSD
 The first Nokia phone after the 6310 to have integrated Bluetooth
 IrDA
 WAP 1.2.1
 Java applications

Java
This phone supports the following Java APIs:
 CLDC 1.0
 MIDP 1.0
 Nokia UI API

References

External links
Nokia 6310i Developers page
Register Review
User Manual download

6310i
Mobile phones with infrared transmitter